"The Invader of Fort Duckburg" is a 1994 Scrooge McDuck comic by Don Rosa. It is the tenth of the original 12 chapters in the series The Life and Times of Scrooge McDuck. The story takes place in 1902.

The story was first published in the Danish Anders And & Co. #1994-10; the first American publication was in Uncle Scrooge #294, in October 1995.

Plot
The first three Junior Woodchucks are expelled from their former headquarters, the ruins of Fort Duckburg, recently bought by Scrooge McDuck. To reclaim the fort, they appeal to a "higher authority" by wire, which turns out to be an all-ears U. S. President Theodore Roosevelt:

Attorney General William Henry Moody: They say a billionaire from Scotland has seized a military installation on the coast!Roosevelt: Great jumping Jehoshaphat! The three dangers that I campaign strongest against - big business, foreign interference, and military threats to our shores - all rolled into one! Egad!

At the same time, the Beagle Boys - Blackheart Beagle's sons, recently released from jail - invade the Fort to steal Scrooge's barrels of money, but they are interrupted when the Fort is surrounded by the entire United States Army and Navy, as well as the Rough Riders, led by a furious Roosevelt in person.

After an enduring battle fought pretty much against Scrooge alone, eventually the President's troops fold against the infamous temper of Scrooge's sister Hortense. Roosevelt charges through the gate alone, only for he and Scrooge to recognize each other from their meeting in Montana years ago and fondly share a weenie roast inside the fort, which Matilda glumly says is not what she and Hortense had in mind when they imagined their newly wealthy family being invited to dine with the President.

When the McDuck siblings first arrive in Duckburg to inspect the property, Hortense also meets her future husband, farmer's son Quackmore Duck (Donald Duck's father).

External links

The Invader of Fort Duckburg on Duckman
The Life and Times of $crooge McDuck - Episode 10

Disney comics stories
Donald Duck comics by Don Rosa
Fiction set in 1902
1994 in comics
Comics set in the 1900s
Cultural depictions of Theodore Roosevelt
The Life and Times of Scrooge McDuck